Utah State Route 239 may refer to:
Utah State Route 239 (1947-1969)
Utah State Route 239 (1981-2007)